A hangnail is a skin lesion.

Hangnail may also refer to:
 Hangnail (band), a Christian punk musical group
 "Hangnail", a song by Nickelback from the album Silver Side Up, 2001